Tiru may refer to:

People
 Bogdan Țîru (born 1994), Romanian football player
 Märt Tiru (1947–2005), Estonian military officer
 Stephen M. Tiru (1937–2012), Roman Catholic bishop
 Toomas Tiru (born 1969), Estonian skier

Places
 Tiru Dam, India

Other
 Tiru, one of the Tamil honorifics
 USS Tiru (SS-416)